Brett Lysak (born December 30, 1980) is a Canadian former ice hockey player. He played 2 games in the National Hockey League with the Carolina Hurricanes during the 2003–04 season. The rest of his career, which lasted from 2001 to 2013, was spent in various minor leagues and later in Europe.

Playing career
Lysak was drafted 49th overall by the Carolina Hurricanes in the 1999 NHL Entry Draft, with whom he played two regular season games during the 2002–03 NHL season.  He also spent three seasons with the Lowell Lock Monsters of the American Hockey League and had a short spell in the East Coast Hockey League with the Florida Everblades.  During the NHL lockout, he played in Germany's Deutsche Eishockey Liga with the Iserlohn Roosters.

He moved to Serie A in 2005 after playing four games for the Manitoba Moose.  In 2006–07, he was the team's top scorer with 16 goals and 29 assists for 45 points in just 28 games. In 2009–10, he was the League's top scorer with 23 goals in the Danish ice hockey Premier League AL-Bank Ligaen. He played for Odense Bulldogs for his first season in Danish ice hockey followed by EfB Ishockey and SønderjyskE Ishockey

After competing with the Graz 99ers in the Austrian Hockey League of the 2011–12 season, Lysak returned to North America after seven years signing a one-year deal with the Kalamazoo Wings of the ECHL on September 13, 2012.

Career statistics

Regular season and playoffs

Awards and achievements
 Named to the WHL East Second All-Star Team in 1999

References

External links
 

1980 births
Living people
Canadian expatriate ice hockey players in Austria
Canadian expatriate ice hockey players in Slovenia
Canadian expatriate ice hockey players in Germany
Canadian expatriate ice hockey players in the United States
Canadian ice hockey centres
Carolina Hurricanes draft picks
Carolina Hurricanes players
EfB Ishockey players
Florida Everblades players
Graz 99ers players
HK Acroni Jesenice players
Ice hockey people from Alberta
Iserlohn Roosters players
Kalamazoo Wings (ECHL) players
Lowell Lock Monsters players
Manitoba Moose players
Odense Bulldogs players
Regina Pats players
SønderjyskE Ishockey players
Sportspeople from St. Albert, Alberta